The name Cam has been used for two tropical cyclones in the western north Pacific Ocean.
 Tropical Storm Cam (1996) (T9604, 05W, Ditang), no threat to land
 Tropical Storm Cam (1999) (T9919, 25W), minimal disruption in Hong Kong

Pacific typhoon set index articles